The Infosys Prize is an annual award given to scientists, researchers, engineers and social scientists of Indian origin (not necessarily born in India) by the Infosys Science Foundation and ranks among the highest monetary awards in India to recognize research. The prize for each category includes a gold medallion, a citation certificate, and prize money of US$100,000 (or its equivalent in Indian Rupees). The prize purse is tax free in the hands of winners in India. The winners are selected by the jury of their respective categories, headed by the jury chairs.

In 2008, the prize was jointly awarded by the Infosys Science Foundation and National Institute of Advanced Studies for mathematics. The following year, three additional categories were added: Life Sciences, Mathematical Sciences, Physical Sciences and Social Sciences. In 2010, Engineering and Computer Science was added as a category. In 2012, a sixth category, Humanities, was added.

Laureates in Engineering and Computer Science 
The Infosys Prize in Engineering and Computer Science has been awarded annually since 2010.

Laureates in Humanities 
The Infosys Prize in Humanities has been awarded annually since 2012.

Laureates in Life Sciences 
The Infosys Prize in Life Sciences has been awarded annually since 2009.

Laureates in Mathematical Sciences 
The Infosys Prize in Mathematical Sciences has been awarded annually since 2008.

Laureates in Physical Sciences 
The Infosys Prize in Physical Sciences has been awarded annually since 2009.

Laureates in Social Sciences 
The Infosys Prize in Social Sciences has been awarded annually since 2009.

Trustees 
 N. R. Narayana Murthy
 S. Gopalakrishnan
 K. Dinesh
 S. D. Shibulal
 T.V. Mohandas Pai
 Srinath Batni
 Nandan Nilekani

Controversies 
Lawrence Liang, a professor of law awarded the Infosys Prize, was found guilty by an internal university inquiry committee of sexually harassing a doctoral student on multiple occasions. Following the adverse finding, prominent activists, academicians and gender rights groups issued a public statement on social media condemning Liang and criticising the award of the Infosys Prize to Liang.

See also

 List of Infosys Prize laureates
 List of chemistry awards
 List of engineering awards
 List of mathematics awards
 List of physics awards
 List of social sciences awards

Notes

External links 
  

 
 
 
 

Indian awards
Indian science and technology awards
Infosys
Awards established in 2008
Mathematics awards
Physics awards
2008 establishments in India